Kevin Coleman Jr. is an American football wide receiver for the Louisville Cardinals. He previously played at Jackson State.

Early life and high school
Coleman grew up in St. Louis, Missouri and attended St. Mary's High School. As a senior he caught 37 passes for 985 yards and 17 touchdowns, rushed for 435 yards and six touchdowns on 37 carries, and gained 573 yards and scored six touchdowns on 21 kickoff and punt returns. Coleman was a consensus top-100 recruit and committed to play college football at FCS Jackson State over offers from major programs such as Oregon, Miami, and Florida State.

College career
Coleman had 32 receptions for 475 yards and three touchdowns as a true freshman. Coleman was named the Southwestern Athletic Conference (SWAC) Freshman of the Year at the end of the regular season. He was the leading receiver in Jackson State's 41-34 loss in the 2022 Celebration Bowl, gaining 137 yards and one touchdown on seven receptions. Coleman entered the NCAA transfer portal a few days after the Celebration Bowl.

Coleman ultimately transferred to Louisville.

References

External links
Jackson State Tigers bio

Living people
Players of American football from St. Louis
American football wide receivers
Jackson State Tigers football players
Year of birth missing (living people)